How Could You may refer to:

 "How Could You" (Mario song)
 "How Could You" (K-Ci & JoJo song)